Erlaaer Straße  is a station on  of the Vienna U-Bahn. It is located in the Liesing District. It opened on 15 April 1995 as part of the section between Philadelphiabrücke and Siebenhirten.

In the architecture of all new stations of the U6 south branch, a new forming technology of aluminum trapezoidal sheeting was used, which allowed the construction of differently shaped arches. Particularly striking are the elevator towers rounded at the top, designed by Johann Georg Gsteu.

References

Buildings and structures in Liesing
Railway stations opened in 1995
Vienna U-Bahn stations